Raphael Ravenscroft (4 June 1954 – 19 October 2014) was a British musician, composer and author.  He is best known for playing the saxophone on Gerry Rafferty's song "Baker Street".

Early life
While his place of birth is disputed, the England and Wales Birth Index places it at Stoke-on-Trent. He was the eldest son of Trevor Ravenscroft, author of the 1972 occult book The Spear of Destiny, and spent much of his young life in Dumfries, where his father lived.

Career

Gerry Rafferty and "Baker Street"
In January 1978, Scottish singer-musician Gerry Rafferty released his first solo material since 1972 and first material of any kind since the demise of Stealers Wheel in 1975. As a then-unheralded session musician, Ravenscroft was asked to play the saxophone on the album City to City (1978). His contribution included the sax riff on the best-known song from the album and of Rafferty's career, "Baker Street". The song was an international hit, charting at number 3 in the UK and number 2 in the US. "Baker Street" was reported in 2010 as having received 5 million air plays worldwide to date. City to City reached number 1 in the US album charts and went platinum. In the UK the album reached number 6 and went gold.

Ravenscroft told the BBC's The One Show in 2010 that he was only paid £27.50 for the "Baker Street" session, which was the Musicians' Union rate at the time. It has been (falsely) reported that the cheque bounced and that it was kept on the wall of Ravenscroft's solicitors; in contrast, the song is said to have earned Rafferty £80,000 a year in royalties.

The saxophone break on "Baker Street" has been described as "the most famous saxophone solo of all time", "the most recognizable sax riff in pop music history", and "one of the most recognisable saxophone solos of all time".

In a radio interview in 2011, Ravenscroft said that his performance on the song annoyed him. "I'm irritated because it's out of tune", he said. "Yeah, it's flat. By enough of a degree that it irritates me at best." Ravenscroft mostly refused to play "Baker Street" during interviews. The last time Ravenscroft played "Baker Street" was in the summer of 2014 when he organised a charity gala concert in Exeter for Nicole Hartup, a 12-year-old city schoolgirl who had died in a fall.

Ravenscroft worked with Rafferty from 1977 to 1982. As well as the songs he worked on for City to City he contributed to Rafferty's next two albums, Night Owl (1979) on which he played the lyricon on the title track of the album, and follow-up album Snakes and Ladders (1980).

In 2011, he recorded a tribute to commemorate the funeral of Gerry Rafferty called "Forgiveness" with friend/producer Grice Peters at Sound Gallery studios, which combined his saxophone playing with the voices of Grammy-nominated choir Tenebrae.

While Ravenscroft falsely claimed to have made the decision to incorporate the riff (based, he said, on "an old blues riff") into "Baker Street", earlier demo recordings for "Baker Street" have the same refrain, played by Rafferty on guitar, which were recorded before Ravenscroft became involved in the sessions for the song, indicating that Ravenscroft was not responsible for including the melody in the song. An almost identical riff had actually been written ten years earlier for the 1968 Steve Marcus jazz track "Half a Heart", and it has been suggested by Gary Burton, a friend of Marcus, that Ravenscroft's performance on "Baker Street" was likely influenced by the earlier song.

Other work
From his breakthrough with "Baker Street" he went on to perform with Pink Floyd (The Final Cut, 1983), ABBA and Marvin Gaye. Other Ravenscroft performing credits include work with America, Maxine Nightingale, Daft Punk, Kim Carnes, The Only Ones, Mike Oldfield, Chris Rea, Robert Plant, Brand X, Hazel O'Connor and Bonnie Tyler. In 1979, he released the solo album Her Father Didn't Like Me, Anyway (CBS Portrait JR 35683). In 1983, Ravenscroft released the track "Maxine" which gained airplay, but performed poorly on the charts. In 1987, he was credited, along with Max Early and Johnny Patrick for the new theme to the Central Television soap opera Crossroads.

In 2010, Ravenscroft played on albums and on sessions with Duffy, Mary Hopkin and Jamie Hartman. In 2011–12, Ravenscroft contributed to the album Propeller by Grice Peters (GRICE).

Ravenscroft wrote several books on saxophone technique, including The Complete Saxophone Player (1990).

In 2012, Ravenscroft created the music for a series of films featuring photographer Don McCullin, and during 2011–2012 composed for several major advertising campaigns around the world. In summer 2012 he took a break due to ill-health, and moved back to Devon.

In 2014, Ravenscroft went to Belgium to help and set up the saxophone project Wie is Sax4Pax? with the company Adolphe Sax & Cie.

Personal life and death
He married and divorced twice, and separated from his third wife in 2009. His daughter is the artist Scarlett Raven. Ravenscroft died on 19 October 2014 at the Royal Devon and Exeter Hospital, aged 60, of a suspected heart attack.

Collaborations 
 City to City - Gerry Rafferty (1978)
 Night Owl - Gerry Rafferty (1979)
 Romance Dance - Kim Carnes (1980)
 Snakes and Ladders - Gerry Rafferty (1980)
 In Our Lifetime - Marvin Gaye (1981)
 The Pros and Cons of Hitch Hiking - Roger Waters (1984)
Pictures at Eleven, Robert Plant, Pledge Pin

References

External links
 
Raphael Ravenscroft on Myspace
LinkedIn profile

1954 births
2014 deaths
English rock saxophonists
British male saxophonists
English male writers
People from Stoke-on-Trent
People from Dumfries
Musicians from Staffordshire
20th-century saxophonists